In computer science, vanilla is the term used to refer when computer software and sometimes also other computing-related systems like computer hardware or algorithms are not customized from their original form, i.e., they are used without any customizations or updates applied to them.  Vanilla software has become a widespread de facto industry standard, widely used by businesses and individuals.  The term comes from the traditional standard flavor of ice cream, vanilla. According to Eric S. Raymond's The New Hacker's Dictionary, "vanilla" means more "default" than "ordinary".

Examples of how to use "vanilla" in a sentence:
 As one of the earliest examples, IBM's mainframe text publishing system BookMaster, provides a default way to specify which parts of a book to publish, called "vanilla", and a fancier way, called "mocha".
 The term "vanilla" is sometimes also used for hardware components. For instance, in the 1990s non-upgraded Amiga home computers were called "(plain) vanilla"; similarly, it was later also applied to PC parts.
 For Unix-based kernels, a "vanilla kernel" refers to a kernel that has been unmodified by any third-party source. For instance, the vanilla Linux kernel is often given a Linux distribution–specific "flavour" by being heavily modified.
 In his book End of Ignorance, Charles Winborne refers to a static page that is ″only a text file, but one that links to accompanying files″ as a plain-vanilla web page.
 Fans of the video game Minecraft, usually refer to the game without mods as "vanilla".
 JavaScript, when used without any libraries or third party plugins is referred to as "vanilla JavaScript".

See also 

 Commercial off-the-shelf
 Mod (video games)
 Out of the box (feature)
 Plain vanilla
 Turnkey

References 

Computing terminology

de:Vanilla software